Melitaeini are a group of brush-footed butterflies. Usually classified as a tribe of the Nymphalinae, they are sometimes raised to subfamily status as Melitaeinae. Common names include the highly ambiguous fritillaries (also used for some Heliconiinae), checkerspots, crescents, or crescentspots, and some genus-specific names.

Genera

The 20–25 genera of Melitaeini are divided among five subtribes; some species are also listed. The subtribes, in the presumed phylogenetic sequence, are:

Subtribe Euphydryina
 Euphydryas – fritillaries, checkerspots
Subtribe Melitaeina
 Melitaea – fritillaries (including Didymaeformis, Mellicta)
Subtribe Chlosynina
 Antillea Higgins, [1959]
 Atlantea Higgins, [1959]
 Chlosyne – checkerspots, patches
 Dymasia Higgins, 1960
 Higginsius Hemming, 1964 (tentatively placed here; Gnathotrichina?)
 Microtia Bates, 1864
 Poladryas Bauer, 1975
 Texola Higgins, 1959 – checkerspots
 Texola elada – Elada checkerspot
Subtribe Gnathotrichina
 Gnathotriche C. & R. Felder, 1862

Subtribe Phyciodina
 Anthanassa Scudder, 1875 – crescents, crescentspots
 Anthanassa ardys – Ardys crescent
 Anthanassa frisia – Cuban crescent, Cuban crescentspot
 Castilia Higgins, 1981
 Dagon Higgins, 1981
 Eresia Boisduval, 1836
 Janatella Higgins, 1981
 Mazia Higgins, 1981
 Ortilia Higgins, 1981
 Phyciodes – crescents, crescentspots
 Phystis Higgins, 1981
 Tegosa Higgins, 1981
 Tegosa anieta
 Telenassa Higgins, 1981
 Tisona Higgins, 1981

Footnotes

References

 Savela, Markku (2010): Lepidoptera and Some Other Life Forms – Melitaeini. Version of 30 June 2010. Retrieved 10 February 2011.

 
Nymphalinae
Butterfly tribes